Emmanuel Yeboah (born 10 August 1997) is a Ghanaian sprinter, who currently competes at Texas A&M University. Yeboah was selected to represent Ghana at the 2020 Summer Olympics in the Men's 4 × 100 m relay.

References

External links 
 Emmanuel Yeboah  at Olympics Tokyo 2020
 

1997 births
Living people
Ghanaian male sprinters
Athletes (track and field) at the 2020 Summer Olympics
Olympic athletes of Ghana
Texas A&M Aggies men's track and field athletes
21st-century Ghanaian people